Our Men in San Francisco is a live album by the American folk music group, The Limeliters, a trio made up of Lou Gottlieb, Alex Hassilev, and Glenn Yarbrough. It was recorded at a live performance at the Hungry i nightclub in San Francisco. It was released in 1963 on the RCA Victor label (catalog no. LPM-2609).

The album debuted on Billboard magazine's Top 40 pop album chart on March 9, 1963, peaked at No. 37, and remained on the chart for two weeks.

AllMusic gave the album a rating of four stars. Reviewer Cary Ginell called it an "entertaining blend of humor, poignancy, and instrumental virtuosity."

Track listing
Side A
 "The Wabash Cannonball" [2:27]
 "Max Goolis" [3:42]
 "I'm Goin' Back" [2:07]
 "Corn Whiskey" [3:56]
 Civil War Medley: "Bright Golden Buttons"; "The First Battalion"; "Yes I See"; "Two Brothers" [6:20]

Side B
 "By The Risin' Of The Moon" [3:31]
 "Yerakina" [2:20]
 "The Lute Player" ("Le Joueur De Luth") [4:57]
 "The Jam On Jerry's Rock" [3:10]
 "Sleep Soft (Lullaby)" [2:35]
 Medley: "Goodnight Ladies"; "Leaving A Song" [2:54]

References

1963 live albums
The Limeliters albums